The 2016 United States House of Representatives elections in New York were held on November 8, 2016, to elect 27 U.S. Representatives from the state of New York. The elections coincided with the 2016 U.S. presidential election, as well as other elections to the House of Representatives, elections to the United States Senate and various state and local elections. The primaries took place on June 28.

In the general election, 18 Democrats and nine Republicans prevailed. No incumbents were defeated.

Overview

District 1

The 1st district is located in eastern Long Island and includes most of central and eastern Suffolk County. The incumbent was Republican Lee Zeldin, who has represented the district since 2015. He was first elected in 2014 with 53% of the vote, defeating Democratic incumbent Tim Bishop.  The district has a PVI of R+2.

Suffolk County Planning Commission Chairman David Calone and Southampton town supervisor Anna Throne-Holst ran for the Democratic nomination.  Other potential Democratic candidates included former Brookhaven Supervisor Mark Lesko and Suffolk County Legislator Kara Hahn.  Throne-Holst won the primary with 51.98% of the vote, with 6,579, getting 417 more votes than Calone, at 6,162.

Democratic primary

Results

General election

Polling

Results

District 2

The 2nd district is based along the South Shore of Long Island and includes southwestern Suffolk County and a small portion of southeastern Nassau County. The incumbent was Republican Peter T. King, who has represented the district since 2013, and previously represented the 3rd district from 1993 to 2013. He was re-elected with 65% of the vote in 2014 and the district has a PVI of R+1.

DuWayne Gregory, the Presiding Officer of the Suffolk County Legislature, ran for the Democratic nomination.

General election

Results

District 3

The 3rd district is based along the north shore of Long Island and includes portions of Nassau and Suffolk Counties. The incumbent, Democrat Steve Israel, had represented northern Long Island since 2000 (as the 2nd district from 2000 to 2012 and the 3rd district since then) and announced he would not seek re-election on January 5, 2016.

State Senator Jack Martins was unopposed for the Republican nomination.  Former Nassau County Executive Thomas Suozzi defeated four other candidates for the Democratic nomination.  Suozzi would defeat Martins in the general election.

Democratic primary

Candidates 
Declared
 Joseph C. Clarke, perennial candidate
 Jonathan Kaiman, former North Hempstead town supervisor and chair of Nassau County finance board
 Anna Kaplan, North Hempstead town council member
 Steve Stern, Suffolk County legislator, 16th district & businessman
 Thomas Suozzi, former Nassau County executive & mayor of Glen Cove

Declined
 Judi Bosworth, Nassau County legislator, 10th district
 Steve Israel, incumbent U.S. Representative
 William Spencer, Suffolk County legislator, 18th district
 Robert Zimmerman, Long Island Economic development commissioner

Results

General election

Results

District 4

Kathleen Rice, the incumbent Democrat, who won election to her first term in 2014 with 51%, was challenged in the general election by the Republican candidate, David H. Gurfein.

General election

Results

District 5

The 5th district is mostly located entirely within Queens in New York City, but also includes a small portion of Nassau County. The incumbent was Democrat Gregory Meeks, who has represented the district since 2013 and previously represented the 6th district from 1998 to 2013. He was re-elected in 2012 with 90% of the vote and the district has a PVI of D+35.

Democratic Primary

Results

General election

Results

District 6

Democratic incumbent Grace Meng was challenged by Danniel S. Maio.

General election

Results

District 7

The 7th district is located entirely in New York City and includes parts of Brooklyn, Queens, and Manhattan. The incumbent was Democrat Nydia Velázquez, who has represented the district since 2013, and previously represented the 12th district from 1993 to 2013. She was re-elected in 2014 with 56% of the vote and the district has a PVI of D+34.

Democratic Primary

Results

General election

Results

District 8

General election

Results

District 9

General election

Results

District 10

The 10th district is located in New York City and includes the Upper West Side of Manhattan, the west side of Lower Manhattan, including Greenwich Village and the Financial District, and parts of Brooklyn, including Borough Park. The incumbent was Democrat Jerrold Nadler, who has represented the district since 2013 and previously represented the 8th district from 1993 to 2013 and the 17th district from 1992 to 1993. He was re-elected in 2014 with 82% of the vote and the district has a PVI of D+23.

Democratic Primary

Results

General election

Results

District 11

The 11th district is located entirely in New York City and includes all of Staten Island and parts of southern Brooklyn. The incumbent was Republican Dan Donovan, who took office in 2015 after the resignation of Republican Michael Grimm. Donovan took office after winning a 2015 special election over Democrat Vincent J. Gentile. The district has a Cook Partisan Voting Index (PVI) of R+2.

General election

Results

District 12

The 12th district is located entirely in New York City and includes several neighborhoods in the East Side of Manhattan, Greenpoint and western Queens. The incumbent was Democrat Carolyn Maloney, who has represented the district since 2013, and previously represented the 14th district from 1993 to 2013. She was re-elected in 2014 with 84% of the vote and the district has a PVI of D+27.

Historian, professor and communications director for Mike Gravel's 2008 presidential campaign David Eisenbach formed an exploratory committee for a potential primary challenge of Maloney.

Democratic Primary

Results

General election

Results

District 13

The 13th district is located entirely in New York City and includes Upper Manhattan and a small portion of the western Bronx. The incumbent was Democrat Charles Rangel, who has represented the district since 2013, and previously represented the 15th district from 1993 to 2013, the 16th district from 1983 to 1993, the 19th district from 1973 to 1983 and the 18th district from 1971 to 1973. He was re-elected in 2014 with 87% of the vote and the district has a PVI of D+42.

Rangel said during the 2014 election and confirmed after his victory that he would not run for a 24th term in 2016.

Rangel had faced strong primary challenges in previous elections and had said that he will be "involved" in picking his successor. Former state assemblyman, former city councilman and candidate for the seat in 1996 and 2010 Adam Clayton Powell IV, the son of former U.S. Representative Adam Clayton Powell Jr., whom Rangel unseated in the primary in 1970, ran for the seat.  State Assemblyman Keith L. T. Wright also ran for the seat.

Democratic primary

Candidates
Declared
 Adriano Espaillat, state senator and candidate for the seat in 2012 and 2014
 Mike Gallagher, graphic artist
 Suzan Johnson Cook, pastor, former White House advisor, and former United States Ambassador-at-Large for International Religious Freedom
 Guillermo Linares, state assemblyman
 Bill Perkins, state senator
 Adam Clayton Powell IV, former state assemblyman, candidate for the seat in 1996 and 2010, and son of former U.S. Representative Adam Clayton Powell Jr.
 Clyde Williams, former Democratic National Committee political director and candidate for the seat in 2012
 Keith L. T. Wright, state assemblyman and former chairman of the New York State Democratic Committee

Declined
 Inez Dickens, New York City Councilwoman
 Melissa Mark-Viverito, New York City Council Speaker
 David Paterson, chairman of the New York State Democratic Committee and former governor of New York
 Charles Rangel, incumbent U.S. Representative
 Robert J. Rodriguez, state assemblyman
 Michael Walrond, pastor and candidate for the seat in 2014

Results

General election

Results

District 14

Democratic incumbent Joe Crowley had been elected to the 14th district in 2014 and in 2012. In November 2016, he was challenged in the general election by Republican Frank Spotorno. Crowley won reelection, attaining 77.7% of the vote. The 14th district had a Cook PVI of D+29.

This was Crowley's final victory in an election for U.S. representative of New York's 14th congressional district. In June 2018, Crowley was defeated by Alexandria Ocasio-Cortez in the primary election for the Democratic party. He was defeated again in the general election in November 2018.

General election

Results

District 15

The 15th district is located entirely within The Bronx in New York City and is one of the smallest districts by area in the entire country. The incumbent was Democrat José E. Serrano, who has represented the district since 2013, and previously represented the 16th district from 1993 to 2013 and the 18th district from 1990 to 1993. He was re-elected with 90% of the vote in 2014 and the district has a PVI of D+43.

Former Bronx Borough President and former director of the White House Office of Urban Affairs Adolfo Carrión, Jr., who was the Independence Party nominee for Mayor of New York City in 2013, considered challenging Serrano from the right in the Democratic primary, but ultimately declined to run.

Democratic primary

Results

General election

Results

District 16

Democratic incumbent, Eliot Engel was challenged by Independent Candidate Derickson K. Lawrence.

General election

Results

District 17

Democratic incumbent, Nita Lowey is not being challenged.

General election

Results

District 18

The 18th district is located entirely within the Hudson Valley, covering all of Orange County and Putnam County, as well as parts of southern Dutchess County and northeastern Westchester County. The incumbent was Democrat Sean Patrick Maloney. He was elected to the house in 2012 by a slim margin, defeating former Republican Rep. Nan Hayworth, and defeated her again in 2014 in a rematch by a slim margin. The district has an even PVI.

Democratic primary

Candidates

Declared
 Sean Patrick Maloney, incumbent
 Diana Hird, attorney

Republican primary

Candidates

Declared
 Ken Del Vecchio, filmmaker
 Phil Oliva Jr., senior advisor to Westchester County Executive Rob Astorino

Withdrew
 Sakima Brown, former Poughkeepsie school board member, Iraq War veteran, and nominee for State Assembly in 2014
 Dan Castricone, former Orange County legislator and 2014 State Assembly candidate
 John Lange, former state legislative aide
 Frank Spaminato

Endorsements

Results

General election

Results

District 19

The 19th district is located in New York's Hudson Valley and Catskills regions and includes all of Columbia, Delaware, Greene, Otsego, Schoharie, Sullivan and Ulster counties, and parts of Broome, Dutchess, Montgomery and Rensselaer counties. The incumbent was Republican Chris Gibson, who has represented the district since 2013, and previously represented the 20th district from 2011 to 2013. He was re-elected in 2014 with 63% of the vote and the district has a PVI of D+1.

Gibson, a supporter of term limits, had pledged to limit himself to four terms in office but retired at the end of his third.

Possible Republican candidates included State Senator James L. Seward, State Assemblymen Pete Lopez and Steven McLaughlin, Rensselaer County Executive Kathleen M. Jimino, Dutchess County Executive Marcus Molinaro and former Cobleskill Town Councilman Ryan McAllister.

On the Democratic side, possible candidates included Ulster County Executive Michael P. Hein, investor and 2014 nominee Sean Eldridge, prosecutor and 2012 nominee Julian Schreibman, Saratoga Springs Mayor Joanne Yepsen, former state senator Terry Gipson, and Albany Assemblywoman Pat Fahy. However, only Will Yandik and Zephyr Teachout filed papers with the New York State Board of Elections. Teachout was also unopposed in filing for the Working People's Party nomination.

Republican primary

Candidates
Declared
 John Faso, former New York assemblyman and nominee for governor in 2006
 Andrew Heaney, heating oil executive

Withdrawn
 Pete Lopez, state assemblyman

Declined
 Chris Gibson, incumbent U.S. Representative
 James L. Seward, state senator

Endorsements

Polling

Results

Democratic primary

Candidates

Declared
 John Patrick Kehoe, music agency CEO and management consultant Though filing with the Federal Elections Commission, he never filed with the New York State Board of Elections.
 Zephyr Teachout, professor and 2014 gubernatorial candidate
 Will Yandik, Deputy Livingston Town Supervisor

Declined
 Sean Eldridge, investor and nominee in 2014

Endorsements

Polling

Results
In the June 28th, 2016 primary, Teachout won the Democratic nomination, defeating Livingston Town Councilman Will Yandik by a 71.11% to 28.65% margin.

General election
This was considered one of the most highly contested races in New York in 2016.

Polling

Results

District 20

Democratic incumbent, Paul Tonko was challenged by Republican Joe Vitollo.

General election

Results

District 21

The 21st district, the state's largest and most rural, includes most of the North Country, as well as the northern suburbs of Syracuse and borders Vermont to the east. The incumbent was Republican Elise Stefanik, who has represented the district since 2015.  She was elected in 2014 with 53% of the vote and the district has an even PVI.

Retired Army Colonel Mike Derrick won the Democratic primary. 2014 nominee Aaron Woolf considered running again in 2016, but decided against it.

2014 Green Party nominee Matt Funiciello started his own radio show in April 2015. He ran in the general election as the Green Party nominee.

General election

Polling

Results

District 22

The 22nd district is located in Central New York and includes all of Chenango, Cortland, Madison and Oneida counties, and parts of Broome, Herkimer, Oswego and Tioga counties. The incumbent, Republican Richard L. Hanna, did not run for re-election.

Republican primary

Endorsements

Polling

Results

Democratic primary
Kim A. Myers, Broome County legislator, won the Democratic nomination unopposed.

General election

Polling

Results

District 23

The 23rd district includes all of Allegany, Cattaraugus, Chautauqua, Chemung, Schuyler, Seneca, Steuben, Tompkins and Yates counties, along with parts of Ontario and Tioga counties. The incumbent was Republican Tom Reed, who has represented the district since 2013, and previously represented the 29th district from 2009 to 2013. He was re-elected in 2014 with 60% of the vote and the district has a PVI of R+3.

General election

Results

District 24

The 24th district includes all of Cayuga, Onondaga and Wayne counties, and the western part of Oswego County. The incumbent was Republican John Katko, who has represented the district since 2015. Colleen Deacon was the Democratic party's nominee opposing him. Katko was elected in 2014 with 59% of the vote, defeating Democratic incumbent Dan Maffei. The district has a PVI of D+3.

Republican primary

Candidates
Declared
 John Katko, incumbent U.S. Representative

Democratic primary

Candidates
Declared
 Colleen Deacon, regional director of U.S. Senator Kirsten Gillibrand's Syracuse office
 Eric Kingson, professor
 Steven Williams, lawyer and former United States Navy JAG Corps officer

Declined
 Dan Maffei, former U.S. Representative

Endorsements

Results

General election

Polling

Results

District 25

The 25th district located entirely within Monroe County, centered on the city of Rochester. The incumbent was Democrat Louise Slaughter, who has represented the district since 2013, and previously represented the 28th district from 1993 to 2013 and the 30th district from 1987 to 1993. She was re-elected in 2014 with 49% of the vote and the district has a PVI of D+7. Due to Slaughter's age, recent health problems, and the death of her husband, there was speculation that she might retire.

Republican Mark Assini, the Town Supervisor of Gates, Conservative nominee for the seat in 2004 and Republican and Conservative nominee for the seat in 2014 is running again.

General election

Results

District 26

Democratic incumbent, Brian Higgins was challenged by Republican Shelly Schratz.

General election

Results

District 27

Republican incumbent, Chris Collins was challenged by Democrat Diana K. Kastenbaum.

General election

Results

References

External links
U.S. House elections in New York, 2016 at Ballotpedia
Campaign contributions at OpenSecrets

House
New York
2016